Charles Dashwood may refer to:

 Charles Dashwood (judge) (1842–1919), Australian public servant and judge
 Charles Dashwood (Royal Navy officer) (1765–1847), British officer